Liron Zarko (born 23 January 1981) is an Israeli professional association football player.

Playing career 
After one season with Hapoel Be'er Sheva, Zarko signed with Chinese Super League club Chongqing Lifan making him the first Israeli to sign with a club in China.

Honours

With Hapoel Kfar Saba
 Liga Leumit: 2004-05

With Hapoel Be'er Sheva
 Toto Cup (Leumit): 2008-09

References

Footnotes

1981 births
Living people
Israeli Jews
Israeli footballers
Association football defenders
Hapoel Kfar Saba F.C. players
Hapoel Petah Tikva F.C. players
Hapoel Be'er Sheva F.C. players
Bnei Sakhnin F.C. players
Chongqing Liangjiang Athletic F.C. players
Chinese Super League players
Israeli Premier League players
Expatriate footballers in China
Israeli expatriate sportspeople in China